César Leonardo Torres  (born 27 October 1975 in Córdoba) is an Argentine retired football midfielder.

Career
Torres began his career with Belgrano de Córdoba and has played for several clubs in Argentina including Racing Club de Avellaneda and Unión de Santa Fe. Torres also had a brief stint playing with Jeonbuk Hyundai Motors in South Korea.

External links
 Argentine Primera Statistics  
 

Footballers from Córdoba, Argentina
Argentine footballers
Argentine expatriate footballers
1975 births
Living people
Association football midfielders
Club Atlético Belgrano footballers
Racing Club de Avellaneda footballers
Unión de Santa Fe footballers
Racing de Córdoba footballers
Godoy Cruz Antonio Tomba footballers
San Martín de San Juan footballers
Deportivo Maipú players
K League 1 players
Jeonbuk Hyundai Motors players
Estudiantes de Río Cuarto footballers
Expatriate footballers in Ecuador
Expatriate footballers in South Korea
Argentine expatriate sportspeople in South Korea
Argentine expatriate sportspeople in Ecuador